Jaroch is a Polish surname. Notable people with the surname include:

 Bartosz Jaroch (born 1995), Polish footballer
 Gracjan Jaroch (born 1998), Polish footballer, cousin of Bartosz

See also
 

Polish-language surnames